Menny (Menahem) Rabinovich (Hebrew: מנחם (מני) רבינוביץ) (September 11, 1934 – June 28, 2012) was a multi-disciplinary Israeli  biochemist with expertise in nutrition, health and medicinal plants. Rabinovich was a  researcher at Hadassah Medical Center in Jerusalem. He was the founder and director of the Wise Nutrition Center and the developer of the dietary supplement Curcumall.  He researched in the fields of molecular biology, science education and integrative medicine focusing on nutrition and health. He served as a member of the scientific committee of the  Hebrew Encyclopedia editor and writer of articles in biochemistry, geology, chemistry and medicine.

Biography
Menny (Menahem) Rabinovich was born in Jerusalem, Israel, to Miriam and Dr. Elchanan Rabinovich, who was Head of the Pediatrics department at the Hadassah Medical Center, and Chairman of Israeli Medical Association. He acquired his academic education in Israel and in the United States. He received his undergraduate degree in Chemistry and Biochemistry from the Hebrew University of Jerusalem,   M.Sc. degree in Microbiology at and his graduate degrees in molecular genetics from the Medical School of Hadassah and Hebrew University.
In 1973 he was granted a UNESCO  fellowship to pursue his studies in the U.S. and Canada in integrating multimedia in science teaching.
In 1975 he received an invitation to serve as a lecturer in science education at the Pennsylvania State University in Pennsylvania, USA as well as a PhD scholarship in  science teaching. He graduated his PhD from Penn State in 1980.
During 1981-1989 he further pursued his studies in nutrition and health with an emphasis on the usage of vitamins and supplements in preventive medicine. While engaged in research and teaching at Penn State he was actively involved in establishing the Jewish Studies program at Penn State. Dr. Rabinovich devoted the last thirty years of his life to integrative medicine and founded and directed The Center for Wise Nutrition in Israel. He was a dynamic and fascinating lecturer on health and nutrition, providing a unique approach to preventive medicine. 
During the last decade of his life Dr. Rabinovich developed the dietary supplement Curcumall,  a concentrated liquid extract of turmeric (Curcuma longa) and curcumin. A clinical trial on cancer patients at the Hadassah Medical Center has demonstrated the effectiveness of Curcumall in treating mucositis.   Curcumall is now marketed in Israel, the US and Mexico.
In creating Curcumall he combined decades of knowledge and experience in biochemistry and medicinal plants with his sincere desire to provide relief to people in pain and anguish.
His wife Aviva is a scientist who assisted him in his scientific work.

Hebrew encyclopedia entries
During 1967-1975 he was a member of the scientific board of the Encyclopedia Hebraica and served as editor and writer of articles on chemistry, biochemistry, geology, and medicine, in seven volumes of the Encyclopedia Hebraica, (for example: Nobel Prizes, liquor, sex and STDs, salicylic acid (aspirin), and more).

Research and Teaching
During his undergraduate studies he worked at the National Laboratory of Physics under the direction of Zvi Tabor on solar energy research focusing on the development of the selective coating of solar panels. 
At Hadassah Medical Center, during his graduate studies, he researched molecular genetics mechanisms focusing on the mechanism of transcription of messenger RNA (m-RNA) as a template for protein synthesis.
At the Medical school he was teaching Microbiology to medical students and started in integrating media in science teaching.  This brought him to get actively involved in the Science Teaching Center of the Hebrew University in Jerusalem, as well as writing and producing science films and instructional TV programs.  In the frame of the Educational TV in Israel, he has written scripts and served as presenter for a series of programs in genetics for high school."The Design and Evaluation of a Theoretical Model for Knowledge Dissemination and its application to the development and implementation of a computerized system for statewide instructional dissemination", was the topic of his Ph.D. at The Pennsylvania State university (1980).  During his studies he was invited to give presentations knowledge dissemination in a number of conferences on science teaching and media (Hershey 1976; New Orleans in 1977, Toronto in 1978, Detroit in 1980, Boston, 1982, etc.).
At Penn State he was also active in establishing the Judaic Studies program. His extensive  knowledge in Judaism and dynamic speaking ability earned him many students. The high enrollment to his courses in Judaism and Jewish history brought the Penn State administration to realize that there is a need in establishing a curriculum and chair in Jewish Studies.

Zionist activism
During his studies in the U.S. he was a lecturer and public speaker on Israeli issues for the UJA and the Bonds. He wrote and published newspaper articles on Israel and the US in Jewish newspapers in New York. He was actively involved in promoting Israeli issues on US campuses and at Penn State he established and directed a non-religious, pro-Israeli student organization called Yachad which received support from the Israeli government.  He also established and directed at Penn State a student exchange summer program of Penn State students at Tel-Aviv University.

Wise Nutrition Center
In the last two decades of his life he founded and directed in Israel the Wise Nutrition Center, promoting public awareness on health and nutrition issues.  The center offered lectures, workshops and courses as well as private consultation on health and nutrition. His knowledge combined with his noted speaking ability brought him many students and followers. He was invited to give lectures and courses at the Prime Minister’s Office and at the Civil Service Commission, and in teacher training courses.

Product Development
Rabinovich  developed a number of health products: 
 Nu-Yolk, a zero-cholesterol egg yolk replacer and extender, filed for a patent in the US but never reached commercial realization.
 Zivion,  a natural hair color developer based on minerals from the Dead Sea R
 Curcumall, a liquid extract of turmeric and curcumin that was shown to enhance the absorption of curcumin from the intestine to the blood. A clinical trial on cancer patients at the Hadassah Medical Center demonstrated  effectiveness treating mucositis. Curcumall is  marketed in Israel, the US and Mexico.

Further reading
Encyclopedia Hebraica (The Hebrew Encyclopedia) volumes: 20-28
Menahem Rabinovich, The Design and Evaluation of a Theoretical Model for Knowledge Dissemination and its application to the development and implementation of a computerized system for statewide instructional dissemination, 1980
Clinical Research on Curcumall for treating mucositis  Hadassah Medical Center 
Selected reprints of papers', Balban Publishing, Rehovot, 1999

External links
Curcumall for treating mucositis in cancer patients, a clinical study at the Hadassah Medical Center 
The Medical School of the Hebrew University and Hadassah     
The department of Jewish Studies at the Pennsylvania State University 
The Wise Nutrition Center (in Hebrew) 
site of Curcumall 
www.curcum-all.com 
The Curcumall Invention 
Dr. Menny – a blog on health and nutrition by Dr. Rabinovich 
Article on Curcumall (in Hebrew) 
Israeli educational television website on Wikipedia Israeli Educational Television

References

Israeli biochemists
1934 births
2012 deaths